Callimerus is a genus of beetles in the family Cleridae (the checkered beetles).

References 

 Yang G.-Y., Montreuil O. and Yang X.-K., 2013: Taxonomic revision of the genus Callimerus Gorham s. l. (Coleoptera, Cleridae). Part I. latifrons species-group. ZooKeys, 294, pages 9–35,

External links 
 
 
 
 Callimerus at insectoid.info

Cleridae genera